Church of the Holy Trinity is a Roman Catholic church in Singapore. 
Its current address is 20 Tampines Street 11, Tampines New Town, Singapore 529455. It currently has an approximate population of 13,720, the largest parish in Singapore.

History
The church was founded in 1988 and is relatively new among the other Roman Catholic churches in Singapore. It was built at a cost of S$8,000,000 and is uniquely designed, being built with features such as a waterfall within the church building itself. A columbarium was also incorporated into the design, with space for 1,400 niches. Thirty-seven acres of the Tampines New Town was itself built on land acquired in 1971 from the Catholic Mission.

Organisation
The church currently has 3 priests administering to a church of about 13720 Parishioners. These priests are:

 Rev Fr Frederick Quek (Parish Priest)
 Rev Fr Luke Zhang (Assistant Parish Priest)
 Rev Fr Joe Dinesh (Assistant Parish Priest)

The church has the following ministries:

 Faith Formation Ministry
 Rite of Christian Initiation for Adults (RCIA)
 Catechetical Ministry
 Charismatic Group
 Neocatechumenate Communities
 1st Community of Holy Trinity
 2nd Community of Holy Trinity
 Liturgical Ministry
 Knights of the Altar (Altar Servers)
 Extraordinary ministers of Holy Communion
 Music Ministry (Choirs)
 Lectors
 Hospitality Ministry
 Youth Ministries
 Holy Trinity Youth
 Service Ministry
 Society of St. Vincent De Paul (SSVP)
 Willing Hands
 Canteen
 Legion of Mary
 Missionary Ministry
 Chinese Group
 Filipino Group
 Neighbourhood Christian Communities (NCC)
 Simei NCC
 Tampines NCC

Affiliations
As a Roman Catholic church, the church is naturally affiliated with all other Roman Catholic schools, churches and organisations, particularly in Singapore. However, there are a few that share a markedly closer relationship because of their geographic proximity.

 East District
 Church of Divine Mercy (Singapore)
 Church of Our Lady Queen of Peace (Singapore)
 Church of Our Lady of Perpetual Succour (Singapore)
 Church of Holy Family (Singapore)
 Church of Holy Trinity (Singapore)
 Church of St Stephen (Singapore)
 Catholic School
 CHIJ Katong Convent
 Hai Sing Catholic School
 Saint Patrick's School
 Saint Anthony's Canossian Primary School
 Saint Anthony's Canossian Secondary School

References

External links
 Holy Trinity website
 Archdiocese of Singapore website
 Simei NCC website
 Neocatechumenate Communities of Singapore
 Trinity Choir website

Roman Catholic churches completed in 1988
1988 establishments in Singapore
Tampines
20th-century Roman Catholic church buildings in Singapore